Vallée du Bandama Region is a defunct region of Ivory Coast. From 1997 to 2011, it was a first-level subdivision region. The region's capital was Bouaké and its area was 28,518 km². Since 2011, the area formerly encompassed by the region is co-extensive with Vallée du Bandama District.

Administrative divisions
At the time of its dissolution, Vallée du Bandama Region was divided into seven departments: Béoumi, Botro, Bouaké, Dabakala, Katiola, Niakaramandougou, and Sakassou.

Abolition
Vallée du Bandama Region was abolished as part of the 2011 administrative reorganisation of the subdivisions of Ivory Coast. The area formerly encompassed by the region is now Vallée du Bandama District.

References

Former regions of Ivory Coast
States and territories disestablished in 2011
2011 disestablishments in Ivory Coast
1997 establishments in Ivory Coast
States and territories established in 1997